Jordan Morris (born 1994) is an American soccer player.

Jordan Morris may also refer to:
Jordan Morris (cricketer) (born 1999), South African cricketer
Jordan Morris (singer), contestant on UK's The X Factor series 11
Jordan Morris, television writer, actor and cohost of Jordan, Jesse, Go!, a weekly American comedy audio podcast
Jordan Morris, poet commended in ACT Writing and Publishing Awards